Route 11, also known as the Woodland Avenue Line, is a trolley line operated by the Southeastern Pennsylvania Transportation Authority (SEPTA) that connects the 13th Street station in downtown Philadelphia, Pennsylvania, to Darby Transportation Center in Darby, Pennsylvania. It is one of five lines that are part of the subway–surface trolley system. Sitting at an average of 13,580 riders per weekday in 2019, it is the most used subway-surface trolley route, even though it lacks overnight service.

Route description
Starting from its eastern end at 13th Street, Route 11 runs in a tunnel under Market Street. It stops at underground stations at 15th Street, 19th Street, 22nd Street, 30th Street, and 33rd Street.  From 15th to 30th Streets, it runs on the outer tracks in the same tunnel as SEPTA's Market–Frankford Line.

Passengers may transfer free of charge to the Market–Frankford Line at 13th, 15th, and 30th Streets and to the Broad Street Line at 15th Street.  Connections to the SEPTA Regional Rail are also available.  Underground passageways connect the 13th and 15th Street Stations to Jefferson Station and Suburban Station.

Route 11 surfaces at the 40th Street Portal near 40th Street and Baltimore Avenue (US 13), and then runs southwest along Woodland Avenue, along with Route 36 trolleys, and then turns down 49th Street where the Route 10 diversion line ends. Route 11 continues its run along Woodland Avenue, and is the most consistent of the five subway–surface lines when it comes to taking a straight route. The line runs parallel to the north side of the Wilmington/Newark Line and crosses a bridge over CSX's Philadelphia Subdivision freight line, at 60th Street.

At the intersection of Island Road and the Cobbs Creek Parkway, an unnamed line runs southward toward Elmwood Depot on the corner of Elmwood Avenue, which is a major turning point for the Route 36 line. The northwest corner is also the home of the historic Blue Bell Inn Route 11 moves northwest from Woodland Avenue to Main Street as it crosses the Cobbs Creek and enters Darby. Here, Route 11 crosses the Philadelphia Subdivision again, but at an at-grade crossing along with 6th Street.
The road and line move to the west shortly, only to turn back northwest and finally north to 9th Street at the Darby Transportation Center. Some Route 13 trolleys also terminate at the station, but the other public transportation consists of SEPTA Suburban Transit Division buses.

History
Route 11 was established as the West Philadelphia Passenger Railway Company in Darby on December 24, 1858, and ran as horsecars from 9th and Main Streets in Darby to 49th Street and Woodland Avenue in West Philadelphia. It was originally a segregated streetcar that required African-Americans to ride on platforms along with the driver, until abolitionist William Still challenged that rule between 1859 and 1867. In 1896, the line was extended as far east as Front Street via Chestnut and Walnut Streets, and was integrated into the subway–surface trolley system by the Philadelphia Rapid Transit Company on December 15, 1906.

The at-grade crossing along Main Street at the intersection of Sixth Street in Darby was the site of the Darby Baltimore and Ohio Railroad station. B&O had passenger service into Philadelphia until 1958.

On December 9, 2021, a Route 11 trolley collided with a CSX Transportation freight train operating on the Philadelphia Subdivision at the at-grade crossing between the two lines near the intersection of Main Street and  Sixth Street in Darby. Seven people on the trolley were injured, and the front windshield was smashed. All of the people injured in the crash were treated and released from the hospital on the same day. This is reportedly the only intersection in the nation where an active freight rail line crosses a fixed active rail transit line.

In 2021, SEPTA proposed rebranding their rail transit service as "SEPTA Metro", in order to make the system easier to navigate. Under this proposal, the subway–surface lines will be rebranded as the "T" lines with a green color and numeric suffixes for each service, and Route 11 would be renamed "T4 Woodland Avenue." SEPTA described that "most comments were positive" in the public comment period for this rebranding project.

Stations and stops
All are in either the City of Philadelphia or the Borough of Darby.

References

External links

Official SEPTA Route 11 schedule and map
Subway-Surface Lines & Proposals on Google Maps

11
Railway lines opened in 1858
Tram routes in Philadelphia
1858 establishments in Pennsylvania